Alphonse de Voss (21 April 1840 – 21 July 1888) was a Belgian Catholic priest, missionary, and Bishop of the Roman Catholic Archdiocese of Suiyuan between 1883 and 1888.

Biography
Alphonse de Voss was born in Bruges, Flemish Region, Belgium, on 21 April 1840. He was ordained a priest on 19 December 1863. He joined the CICM Missionaries in 1868. He came to Mongolia to preach in 1869. He built a church in Shangyi County from 1872 to 1874. On 12 December 1883 the Holy See appointed him as Bishop of the Roman Catholic Archdiocese of Suiyuan. He was consecrated on 18 May 1884.

He died on 21 July 1888, aged 48.

References

1840 births
1888 deaths
People from Bruges
19th-century Belgian Roman Catholic priests
19th-century Roman Catholic bishops in China